Jacques Ciron (17 May 1928 – 7 December 2022) was a French actor.

Biography
Ciron was born in the 17th arrondissement of Paris on 17 May 1928. After gaining recognition for his looks and his voice, he became very popular in cinema and boulevard theatre, particularly in the program Au théâtre ce soir. He was also very active in dubbing, lending his voice to several animated Disney films, as well as to the character Alfred Pennyworth in several live-action Batman films. He also lent his voice to the evil clown It in the miniseries of the same name.

Ciron died in the 20th arrondissement of Paris on 7 December 2022, at the age of 94.

Filmography

The Long Teeth (1952)
 (1952)
Naked in the Wind (1952)
A Caprice of Darling Caroline (1953)
 (1953)
Innocents in Paris (1953)
The Lottery of Happiness (1953)
Tout chante autour de moi (1954)
 (1955)
French Cancan (1955)
Madonna of the Sleeping Cars (1955)
 (1955)
Marie Antoinette Queen of France (1956)
 (1956)
And God Created Woman (1956)
 (1957)
Maigret Sets a Trap (1958)
Gigi (1958)
The Doctor's Horrible Experiment (1959)
 (1961)
All the Gold in the World (1963)
Thank You, Natercia (1963)
The Gorillas (1964)
Lady L (1965)
Woman Times Seven (1967)
Mayerling (1968)
La Prisonnière (1968)
The Brain (1969)
The Scarlet Lady (1969)
 (1970)
The Black Windmill (1974)
 (1977)
 (1979)
 (1980)
Camera d'albergo (1981)
My New Partner (1984)
 (1987)
The Unbearable Lightness of Being (1988)
Frantic (1988)
La Révolution française (1989)
 (1990)
Money (1991)
588 rue paradis (1992)
The Ogre (1996)
 (2006)
Hunting and Gathering (2007)
 (2009)
La croisière (2011)
Paris Manhattan (2012)

References

External links

1928 births
2022 deaths
Male actors from Paris